Arun Lhokseumawe Special Economic Zone or abbreviated as Arun Lhokseumawe KEK, is a Special Economic Zone (SEZ) located in Lhokseumawe city and North Aceh Regency, Aceh, Indonesia. This SEZ has been established through on Government Regulation No. 5 / 2017. 

Arun Lhokseumawe SEZ is spread over 2,622.48 hectares, including 1,840.8ha in Arun Natural Gas Liquefaction Area in Lhokseumawe, 582 hectares in Dewantara, and 199.6 hectares in Jamuan of North Aceh Regency. The development of SEZ Arun Lhokseumawe is being focused on energy, petrochemical, agro industry supporting food security, logistics and kraft paper producing industries. The SEZ consists of an Export Processing Zone, a logistics zone, an industrial zone, an energy zone and a tourism zone.

Access
SEZ Arun Lhokseumawe is located in the world’s busiest international shipping routes next to the Strait of Malacca, and approximately 260 KM from the capital Banda Aceh, and can be reached by land and air transport. Malikus Saleh Airport is about 18 kilometer from SEZ Arun Lhokseumawe, and from the international port of Ocean Pasee +/- 9 KM.

References

Aceh
Post-independence architecture of Indonesia
Planned townships in Indonesia
Ports and harbours of Indonesia
Industrial parks in Indonesia